Poliambulanza is a station of the Brescia Metro, in the city of Brescia in northern Italy. The station is named after the nearby "Fondazione Poliambulanza Istituto Ospedaliero" hospital.

With the opening of a new access road to the city from the south, the station is easily accessible from the Brescia ring road, Autostrada A4 and Autostrada A21. In addition to the existing hospital parking, a new park and ride lot with a capacity of 360 vehicles was added.

References

External links

Brescia Metro stations
Railway stations opened in 2013
2013 establishments in Italy
Railway stations in Italy opened in the 21st century